Marissa Carpadios (born 30 December 1977 in Brisbane) is a softball player from Australia, who won a silver medal at the 2004 Summer Olympics. She was educated at Brisbane State High School.

External links
 Olympic profile

1977 births
Australian softball players
Australian people of Greek descent
Living people
Olympic softball players of Australia
Softball players at the 2004 Summer Olympics
Olympic silver medalists for Australia
Sportswomen from Queensland
Olympic medalists in softball
People educated at Brisbane State High School
Sportspeople from Brisbane
Medalists at the 2004 Summer Olympics